The 2019–20 was the 120th in the history of Eintracht Frankfurt, a football club based in Frankfurt, Germany. It was their 8th consecutive and 51st overall season in the top flight of German football, the Bundesliga, having been promoted from the 2. Bundesliga in 2012. In addition to the domestic league, Eintracht Frankfurt also participated in this season's edition of the domestic cup, the DFB-Pokal. This was the 95th season for Frankfurt in the Commerzbank-Arena, located in Frankfurt, Hesse, Germany. The season originally covered a period from 1 July 2019 to 30 June 2020. It was extended extraordinarily to 6 August 2020 due to the COVID-19 pandemic in Germany.

Players

Squad

Players out on loan

Transfers

In

Out

Friendly matches

Competitions

Bundesliga

League table

Results summary

Results by round

Matches
The Bundesliga schedule was announced on 28 June 2019.

DFB-Pokal

UEFA Europa League

Second qualifying round

Third qualifying round

Play-off round

Group stage

Knockout phase

Round of 32

Round of 16

Statistics

Appearances and goals

|-
! colspan=14 style=background:#dcdcdc; text-align:center| Goalkeepers

|-
! colspan=14 style=background:#dcdcdc; text-align:center| Defenders

|-
! colspan=14 style=background:#dcdcdc; text-align:center| Midfielders

|-
! colspan=14 style=background:#dcdcdc; text-align:center| Forwards

|-
! colspan=14 style=background:#dcdcdc; text-align:center| Players transferred out during the season

Goalscorers

Last updated: 27 July 2020

Clean sheets

Last updated: 17 June 2020

Disciplinary record

Last updated: 17 June 2020

References

External links
  (English)
 German archive site
 2019–20 Eintracht Frankfurt season at kicker.de 
 2019–20 Eintracht Frankfurt season at Fussballdaten.de 

2019-20
German football clubs 2019–20 season